Rupinder Handa is an Indian playback singer.  She has released four albums, including Return Of Rupinder Handa and many more Singles including Pind de gerhe.

Discography

References

External links
 

Living people
Indian women pop singers
Year of birth missing (living people)
Singers from Haryana
Musicians from Chandigarh
21st-century Indian singers
21st-century Indian women singers
People from Sirsa, Haryana